Hegra is a village in the municipality of Stjørdal in Trøndelag county, Norway.

The village is served by the unmanned Hegra Station on the Meråker Line.  The European route E14 highway also runs through the village, just south of Hegra Church. Hegra has its own grocery store, gas station, kindergarten, school and a local bank.  Hegra is also one of the centers for the resurgence of the Dole Gudbrandsdal horse in Norway.

History
The village was the administrative centre of the old municipality of Hegra which existed from 1874 until 1962.

The ancient rock carvings (Leirfald), as well as the small border fort Hegra Fortress (formerly known as Ingstadkleven Fort) are both located in Hegra.  The fortress withstood the invading German army from 10 April to 5 May 1940, not surrendering before all other Norwegian units in Southern Norway and Mid-Norway had capitulated.

Media gallery

Notable people
 Ida Basilier-Magelssen (1846–1928 in Hegra) an opera singer
 Andreas Fleischer (1878–1957) a bishop in the Church of Norway
 Johan Peter Trøite (1880–1977) politician with the Venstre party 
 Ludvik Buland (1893–1945) a trade unionist
 Jon Leirfall (1899–1998) politician with the Senterpartiet
 Arnstein Øverkil (1937–2014) police chief
 Heidrun Kringen, (Norwegian Wiki) (born 1941) an artist
 Gøril Kringen (born 1972) soccer player
and

References

External links
 Hegra Fortress 
 Stjordalsnett.no on Hegra 

Villages in Trøndelag
Stjørdal